Dáithí Lacha (meaning "David Duck") was an Irish language television cartoon series for children broadcast on RTÉ during the 1960s. The series was not animated, however. For each five-minute episode, the creator, illustrator, and camera operator, Flann Ó Riain, produced a static comic strip which was shown one frame at a time. A single narrator, Pádraic Ó Gaora, described the action and spoke the dialogue.

As well as the central character, the series featured Maidhc the dog and Puisín the cat.

The first episode was broadcast on 31 December 1962. For the first few years of its run, the series was transmitted three days a week. By the time the final episode appeared in July 1969, Dáithí Lacha had become a weekly show.

Today, Ireland's first home-grown television cartoon star is remembered by viewers of that generation for his frequent cries of "", as well as for his large striped underpants — the only garb he wore.

References

External links
 Dáithí Lacha at the Internet Movie Database

1962 Irish television series debuts
1969 Irish television series endings
1960s Irish television series
Irish children's television shows
Irish-language television shows
RTÉ original programming